Siegbert Salomon Prawer  (15 February 1925 – 5 April 2012) was Taylor Professor of the German Language and Literature at the University of Oxford.

Life and works
Prawer was born on 15 February 1925 in Cologne, Germany, to Jewish parents Marcus and Eleanora (Cohn) Prawer. Marcus was a lawyer from Poland and Eleanora's father was cantor of Cologne's largest synagogue. His sister Ruth was born in 1927. The family fled the Nazi regime in 1939, emigrating to Britain.

Educated at King Henry VIII School, Coventry, and Jesus College, Cambridge, he was lecturer at the University of Birmingham from 1948 to 1963, Professor of German at Westfield College, London, from 1964, and became Taylor Professor of the German Language and Literature at the University of Oxford in 1969. He was awarded his PhD by Birmingham University in 1953 (PhD, University of Birmingham, Department of German, 1953, 'A critical analysis of 24 consecutive poems from Heine's Romanzero').

He was a Fellow (then an Honorary Fellow) of Queen's College, Oxford, and an Honorary Fellow of Jesus College, Cambridge.

He had academic interests in German poetry and lieder, Romantic German literature, especially E. T. A. Hoffmann and Heinrich Heine, comparative literature and also in film, particularly horror films.

His sister was the writer Ruth Prawer Jhabvala. He made a cameo appearance in the Merchant-Ivory film Howards End (for which his sister wrote the Academy Award-winning screenplay).

Prawer died on 5 April 2012 in Oxford, England.

Publications
1952: German Lyric Poetry: a critical analysis of selected poems from Klopstock to Rilke. London: Routledge & Kegan Paul
1960: Mörike und seine Leser. Stuttgart: Ernst Klett 
1960: Heine. Buch der Lieder. London: Edward Arnold
1961: Heine the Tragic Satirist: a study of the later poetry 1827-56. Cambridge: Cambridge University Press
1964: Penguin Book of Lieder. Harmondsworth: Penguin Books, editor and translator
1969: Essays in German Culture, Language and Society. London: University of London, editor with R. Hinton Thomas, Leonard Wilson Forster, Roy Pascal
1970: Heine's Shakespeare: a study on contexts: inaugural lecture delivered before the University of Oxford on 5 May 1970. Oxford: Clarendon Press 
1970: The Romantic Period in Germany: essays by members of the London University Institute of Germanic Studies, editor
1971: Seventeen Modern German Poets. London: Oxford University Press, editor
1973: Comparative Literary Studies: An Introduction. London: Duckworth
1976: Karl Marx and World Literature. Oxford: Clarendon Press
1980: Caligari's Children: the film as tale of terror. Oxford: Oxford University Press 
1983: Heine's Jewish comedy: a study of his portraits of Jews and Judaism. Oxford: Clarendon Press 
1984: A. N. Stencl, Poet of Whitechapel. Oxford: Oxford Centre for Postgraduate Hebrew studies. 1st Stencl Lecture
1984: Coal-Smoke and Englishmen: a study of verbal caricature in the writings of Heinrich Heine. London: Institute of Germanic Studies, University of London
1986: Frankenstein's Island: England and the English in the writings of Heinrich Heine. Cambridge: Cambridge University Press
1992: Israel at Vanity Fair: Jews and Judaism in the Writings of W. M. Thackeray. Leiden: Brill 
1997: Breeches and Metaphysics: Thackeray's German discourse. Oxford: Legenda 
2000: W. M. Thackeray's European Sketch Books: a study of literary and graphic portraiture. Oxford, New York: P. Lang 
2002: The Blue Angel. (BFI Film Classics.) London: British Film Institute 
2004: Nosferatu: Phantom der Nacht. (BFI Film Classics.) London: British Film Institute
2005: Between Two Worlds: the Jewish presence in German and Austrian film, 1919-1933. (Film Europa: German Cinema in an International Context) New York, Oxford: Berghahn Books 
2009: A Cultural Citizen of the World: Sigmund Freud's knowledge and use of British and American writings. Oxford: Legenda

References

External links
 A fond farewell   Archived from the original on 5 December 2008

1925 births
2012 deaths
Academics of the University of Birmingham
Academics of Westfield College
Fellows of the British Academy
Fellows of Jesus College, Cambridge
Fellows of The Queen's College, Oxford
British film historians
English Jews
Jewish emigrants from Nazi Germany to the United Kingdom
People educated at King Henry VIII School, Coventry
Alumni of Jesus College, Cambridge
Alumni of Christ's College, Cambridge
Alumni of the University of Birmingham
Taylor Professors of the German Language and Literature
German emigrants to England
German people of Polish-Jewish descent
English people of Polish-Jewish descent
English philologists
English people of German-Jewish descent
Deutscher Memorial Prize winners